The Book of Us: Negentropy – Chaos Swallowed Up in Love, often shortened to The Book of Us: Negentropy, is the seventh extended play by South Korean band Day6. It was released by JYP Entertainment on April 19, 2021, and serves as the fifth and final installment of the group's three-year Book of Us series. It is Day6's first release as a whole group since The Book of Us: The Demon (2020), and marks the return of members Sungjin and Jae following their hiatus from the group. The album contains seven tracks co-written by several members of the band and produced by Hong Ji-sang, member Sungjin, and NUPLAY. 

Following Sungjin's enlistment in the South Korean military in March 2021, the band opted not to promote the album as an incomplete group. The Book of Us: Negentropy was supported by its lead single, "You Make Me", and peaked at number three at the Gaon Album Chart.

It also serves as the quintet's final release with the lead vocalist Jae Park before his departure from JYP Entertainment on December 31, 2021 and departure from the group on January 1, 2022.

Background and release 
JYP Entertainment announced the group's comeback on March 29, with the comeback film. On March 30, they announced the album title and dropped the trailer film. They then released the album track list and teaser images of each members. On April 11, they started to release the lyric film videos of every tracks.

On April 19, JYP Entertainment released the album and the title song "You Make Me" and the announcement that Day6 would come back without promotion according to Sungjin's enlistment in the military.

Track listing 
The credits are available on the official album profile on Naver

Charts

References 

JYP Entertainment EPs
Day6 EPs
Korean-language EPs
2021 EPs